10 Peel Centre Drive is a building complex in Brampton, Ontario, Canada that serves as the seat of local government for the Regional Municipality of Peel. The building has been used for regional government offices since its completion in 1980 after relocating from the nearby historic Peel County Courthouse. The complex includes the Peel Regional Council chambers and the offices of Division 21 of the Peel Regional Police. Other regional departments are located at various buildings across Brampton, Mississauga, and Caledon.

The original building (Suite A) is a 6-storey brick structure built in 1980. The new annex (Suite B) is a 6-storey glass, steel and stone structure completed in 2008 which has an additional  of office space.

External links
 

Municipal buildings in Brampton
Regional Municipality of Peel
Government buildings completed in 1980